The City of Ember is a post-apocalyptic novel by Jeanne DuPrau that was published in 2003. The story is about Ember, a post-apocalyptic  underground city threatened by aging infrastructure and corruption. The young protagonist, Lina Mayfleet, and her friend, Doon Harrow (the second protagonist), follow clues left behind by the original builders of the City of Ember, to safety in the outside world.

It is the first book in the Books of Ember series, which also includes The People of Sparks, The Prophet of Yonwood (a prequel), and the final installment, The Diamond of Darkhold. In 2008, the book was adapted into a film by Walden Media and Playtone.

A graphic novel adaptation by comic book artist Niklas Asker was released on September 25, 2012.

Plot
As Earth is being ravaged by a series of apocalyptic events known as the Disaster, a coalition of architects, scientists, and doctors (called the Builders) create an underground city named Ember, with an initial population of 200 citizens (100 elderly adults, 100 babies), to ensure humanity survives, with the intention that future generations of the city will not know about the outside world or that they live underground. They build the city to last for two centuries, after which the citizens of Ember will evacuate and return to the surface world. The Builders give the first mayor of the city a box with a timed lock set to open after 200 years, containing instructions explaining how to leave Ember; the box is passed successfully from mayor to mayor, until the seventh mayor, who, thinking the box might contain a cure for the deadly cough disease plaguing the city, takes the box home and tries multiple times to break it open, but fails. He then dies before he can return the box to its rightful place or inform the next mayor of its importance.

Approximately two hundred and forty-one years after Ember is established, the city′s supplies are in danger of exhaustion and its hydroelectric generator is in decay, causing the power to go out intermittently. At their graduation ceremony, young people are assigned jobs by lottery: Lina Mayfleet is assigned the job of "Pipeworks Laborer" and Doon Harrow is given the job of "Messenger". However, both are displeased with their assigned jobs so they exchange their assignments and begin work in their respective positions. It is revealed that the seventh mayor was Lina's great-great grandfather and the box with the timed lock is in the closet in their house. By now the timer has finished counting down and the lock has clicked open. When searching the closet, Lina's grandmother finds the box but tosses it aside, not realizing its importance. The opened box is found by Lina's baby sister, Poppy. When Lina comes home, she finds Poppy with torn pieces of paper in her hands and mouth; Poppy has all but destroyed the instructions. Lina saves the scraps of paper, thinking they must be an important message from the Builders of the city, since the message is typed and no one in Ember can write like that. The writing on the message resembles the writing on labels and books left by the builders in the city. Using some glue, Lina reassembles the message as best she can. There are many gaps and some words make no sense like "boat" since no one in Ember has seen or heard of boats. Thanks to side character Clary, friend of Lina’s father, she discovers that the title of the document is "Instructions for Egress" or instructions for exit. Lina realizes that the document is instructions on how to leave their dying city.  One of the words on the instructions is clearly "Pipeworks", so Lina enlists the help of Doon who is now working at the Pipeworks. The Pipeworks are underneath the city and a large and fast underground river runs through it that provides the hydroelectric power that Ember runs on. After much trial and error, she and Doon decipher the instructions from the builders. The instructions lead to a hidden room built on the side of the river that contains hundreds of boats as well as matches and candles to create portable light, something unknown in the city of Ember. The builders meant for the citizens of Ember to board these boats and be carried down the river into the outside world.

Lina's grandmother dies shortly after their discovery, and Lina and Poppy move in with a neighbor, Mrs. Murdo. At work, Doon discovers that the mayor of Ember and a storeroom worker named Looper have been stealing supplies, and he and Lina report the crime to the guards, who unknown to them are also corrupt. Upon following the instructions given in the note, they find the room with boats and candles meant for use in the exodus. On their return to Ember, they learn that the mayor has declared them criminals and there are notices everywhere with their names. Doon and Lina plan to escape Ember in the boats and agree to meet at the Pipeworks at a certain time, but just before, Lina is arrested and taken to the mayor, who plans to throw her in jail. Suddenly, a blackout occurs and allows her to escape without being seen; she meets Doon at the Pipeworks with her sister Poppy in tow. Lina, Doon, and Poppy escape in a boat through the river, its current carrying them forward. When the boat stops, they learn the origin of Ember from a diary left by one of its original colonists. Shortly after they are faced with a very steep climb and emerge onto the surface where they see their city from above and realize for the first time that Ember is underground. They throw a rock with instructions tied to it down to the city in hope that the people of Ember will escape. Ultimately, Mrs. Murdo finds the message on the street next to Harken Square barely missing her.

Critical reception
The City of Ember was praised for its setting and main characters, Lina Mayfleet and Doon Harrow. Kirkus Reviews praised the characters, stating: "The likable protagonists are not only courageous but also believably flawed by human pride, their weaknesses often complementing each other in interesting ways." Sally Estes from Booklist commented how readers would be able to connect to Lina and Doon's courage amidst the conflicts. Robert Sutton from Horn Book Magazine compared the novel to Gathering Blue by Lois Lowry, noting how "the darkness of Ember is essentially literal" with the generator (the mechanical light operator) failing and running out of power, leading to frequent blackouts. Sutton noted how DuPrau does not explain the history of Ember all at once, which would confuse and overwhelm the reader and instead, "allows the events of the story to convey the necessary information". Lina and Doon were described as "good sorts" that are "deeply etched". Dian Roback from Publishers Weekly also praised the "full blooded characters" as every bit as good as the plot which would hook readers until the end. Although Jones Johns from School Library Journal wrote that the setting was not as ingenious as the ones in Joan Aiken's Is and Lois Lowry's The Giver, he said that the characters and pace of the plot would keep readers hooked.

Film adaptation

A film adaptation of the novel, directed by Gil Kenan, was produced by Walden Media and Playtone with Bill Murray as the mayor, Saoirse Ronan as Lina, and Harry Treadaway as Doon. Filming was finished in October 2007, and the film was released in theaters a year later on October 10, 2008. City of Ember was released on DVD on January 20, 2009. The film received mixed reviews, with a Metacritic rating of 58/100, indicating "mixed or average reviews".

Awards
2003 Child Magazine's Best Children's Book
2003 Kirkus Editor's Choice
 2006 Mark Twain Award
2006 William Allen White Children's Book Award
American Library Association Notable Book

References

External links
Jeanne DuPrau's website 

 
2003 science fiction novels
2003 American novels
American post-apocalyptic novels
American historical novels
Debut speculative fiction novels
American novels adapted into films
Science fiction novels adapted into films
2003 debut novels
Novels about cities
Mark Twain Awards